The PCL-181 is a Chinese truck-mounted, 155 mm self-propelled howitzer used by the People's Liberation Army Ground Force. The designation 'PCL' is an acronym derived from pinyin.

Development
The PCL-181 made its first public appearance during the 70th Chinese National Day Parade on 1 October 2019.

It was designed to replace the 152 mm PL-66 towed gun-howitzer and the 130 mm Type 59-1 towed field guns used by the PLA and will complement the PLZ-05, and improve upon its functionality in many ways.

Design

Armament 
The gun has a 52-caliber barrel and is exactly the same as that of the PLZ-05 self-propelled howitzer. It has a maximum firing range of up to 40 km with conventional ammunition and 72 km with extended range ammunition. The gun can also fire laser-guided munition which is capable of all weather operation. Each vehicle can carry 27 rounds of ammunition.

The vehicle features semi-automatic ammo reload, where the operator places the shell on the loading arm and the loading arm loads the round into the breech.

The PCL-181 is equipped with an automatic fire control system (AFCS). Following the operator's input of a target's azimuth data, the vehicle-mounted computer can calculate the trajectory of the artillery, and automatically lay the gun.

Mobility 
The PCL-181 is based on Taian GM's 6X6 truck chassis.

Due to its comparatively lighter weight of 25 tons, the PCL-181 can also be transported in a Shaanxi Y-9.

Variants 
PCL-181
PLA designation
SH-15
Export designation

Deployment 
According to state media reports, most of the country’s five military jurisdictions, known as theatre commands, have been equipped with PCL-181 155 mm vehicle-mounted howitzers.

In June 2020, it was reported that the PCL-181 had been deployed in Tibet amid tensions with India.

In February 2021, it was reported that at least 18 PCL-181s had been inducted into the People’s Liberation Army Ground Force’s (PLAGF’s) Xinjiang Military Command.

Operators 
In the Chinese People's Liberation Army Ground Force (PLAGF), each group army commands one artillery brigade which doctrinally includes two self-propelled or towed artillery (122 mm, 152 mm, or 155 mm) battalions, each of which comprises three batteries of four to six howitzers each.

Current operators
 :
People's Liberation Army Ground Force: 300 units as of 2021.
71st Artillery Brigade
72nd Artillery Brigade
73rd Artillery Brigade
74th Artillery Brigade
75th Artillery Brigade
77th Artillery Brigade
80th Artillery Brigade
83rd Artillery Brigade
 : 
Pakistan Army
Pakistan Army Artillery Corps
Official induction took place on 15 March 2021. As per sources Pakistan has acquired around 300 units with TOT to further build these self propelled howitzer locally in Heavy Industries Taxila.
 : 32 
Ethiopian Ground Forces
Satellite imagery confirm the arrival of at least 32 SH-15 (PCL-181) self-propelled howitzers.

References

External links 
SCMP - The cheap, light howitzer China is rolling out in Tibet

Self-propelled artillery of the People's Republic of China
Wheeled_self-propelled_howitzers
Military vehicles introduced in the 2010s